Chanmari Ground is a multi-purpose sports ground located in Kurseong, West Bengal, India. The ground was built in the early 1960s. The main tenant is the Indian Army. Kurseong Gorkha Hill Sports Association organise several events at the ground.

References

External links
 Stadium picture
 3rd Kurseong Saheed Gold Cup final at Chanmari Ground

Football venues in West Bengal
Sports venues in West Bengal
Buildings and structures in Darjeeling district
1960s establishments in West Bengal
Sports venues completed in the 1960s
20th-century architecture in India